School Master is a 1973 Indian Tamil-language film, produced and by directed B. R. Panthulu. The film stars Gemini Ganesan, Sowcar Janaki, Srikanth and Rajasree. It is a remake of Panthulu's 1958 Kannada film of the same name.

Plot 

The film revolves around an old school master and his noble attempt to transform the students of his native village.

Cast 
Gemini Ganesan
Sowcar Janaki
Srikanth
Rajasree
M. N. Nambiar
Cho
Thengai Srinivasan
Kumari Padmini
Rama Prabha
Ennathe Kannaiah
C. K. Saraswathi
R. Muthuraman (Guest Appearance)
S. A. Ashokan (Guest Appearance)

Soundtrack 
The soundtrack by M. S. Viswanathan, while lyrics were written by Kannadasan.

Reception 
Kanthan of Kalki criticised the story for being outdated, and lacking newness.

References

Bibliography

External links 
 

1970s Tamil-language films
1973 films
Films about educators
Films directed by B. R. Panthulu
Films scored by T. G. Lingappa
Tamil remakes of Kannada films